The Commissioner of Police heads the Hong Kong Police Force and, in accordance with Section 4 of the Police Force Ordinance, reports to the Chief Executive of Hong Kong and the Security Bureau. As of June 2021, the current commissioner is Raymond Siu Chak-Yee, appointed by the State Council of China.

Officers in command 

Commissioners of Police currently are mandated to retire before they reach the age of 57, but may be extended upon exceptional circumstances.

Early heads were often military officers or had previous policing experience in the United Kingdom or other British colonies. Many joined the Force in senior command postings before their promotions. Li is the only Commissioner to rise from lower ranks (as Probationary Sub-Inspector) and Hui joined as a probationary Inspector.

References

External links
Government of HKSAR
Organisation chart of Hong Kong Government

Positions of the Hong Kong Government
Hong Kong Police Force
Police ranks